9L or 9-L can refer to:

NY-9L, abbreviation for New York State Route 9L
AIM-9L, a model of AIM-9 Sidewinder
AirTanker Services (IATA code 9L, formerly used by Colgan Air)
9L 3407, code for Colgan Air Flight 3407
Kappa 9L, a model of Kappa (rocket)
GCR Class 9L, a class of British 4-4-2T steam locomotive

See also
L9 (disambiguation)